The North Alabama–West Alabama football rivalry is a college football rivalry game between two public universities in the U.S. state of Alabama, the University of North Alabama Lions and the University of West Alabama Tigers. The current winner is West Alabama, who won 38–17, on September 23, 2017. North Alabama leads the all-time series, 52–18–1.

The 71 previous meetings mark the most games each team has played against another school and the 52 wins for North Alabama are also its most against an opposing institution.

History
North Alabama and West Alabama first met in 1949 and have played every year. West Alabama is the only program that North Alabama has faced in every season since the Lions restored their football program in 1949, after a 21-year-long hiatus since 1928.

Gulf South Conference: 1970–2017
North Alabama and West Alabama have been in the same conference since 1970, and were both founding members of the Mid-South Conference in 1970 and their current conference, Gulf South Conference a year later. The Lions and Tigers have played ever since 1970 for 49 match-ups. In fact, the Lions and Tigers even played twice in the regular season in 1986. In 2011, the Lions and Tigers met in the regular season and post-season.

West Alabama upset North Alabama in both 2002 and 2004 in Livingston, and in 2009 in four overtimes in Florence when the Lions were ranked No. 1 in the nation. That was West Alabama's first win in Florence since 1987. The Tigers were led in that game by former North Alabama head coach Bobby Wallace.

Bobby Wallace has coached at both schools, coaching at North Alabama from 1988 to 1997, West Alabama from 2006 to 2010 and returning to the Lions from 2012 to 2016.

The 2017 season will likely be the last for the rivalry for the foreseeable future, following UNA's announcement that it would upgrade its athletic program to NCAA Division I, joining the ASUN Conference for non-football sports in 2018 and eventually the Big South Conference in football.

Game results

See also 
 List of NCAA college football rivalry games

References

College football rivalries in the United States
North Alabama Lions football
West Alabama Tigers football
1949 establishments in Alabama